Claremont Municipal Airport  is a public-use airport located one nautical mile (1.85 km) west of the central business district of Claremont, a city in Sullivan County, New Hampshire, United States. This general aviation airport is publicly owned by the City of Claremont. It is included in the Federal Aviation Administration (FAA) National Plan of Integrated Airport Systems for 2017–2021, in which it is categorized as a local general aviation facility.

The nearest airport with scheduled airline service is Lebanon Municipal Airport.

Facilities and aircraft 
It has one asphalt paved runway designated 11/29 which measures 3,100 by 100 feet (945 x 30 m).

For the 12-month period ending December 31, 2008, the airport had 10,500 general aviation aircraft operations, an average of 28 per day. At that time there were 29 aircraft based at this airport: 83% single-engine, 10% multi-engine, 3% helicopter and 3% ultralight.

References

External links 
 Claremont Municipal Airport, page at City of Claremont web site
 
 

Airports in New Hampshire
Transportation buildings and structures in Sullivan County, New Hampshire